Bernard McCarthy (24 July 1874 – 7 July 1948) was a New Zealand cricketer, lawyer and papal knight.

Life and work
After attending St. Patrick's College, Wellington, McCarthy moved to Hāwera, where he qualified as a lawyer and in 1903 founded the law firm that is now known as Welsh McCarthy. McCarthy Street in Hāwera is named after him. He became president of the St. Patrick's College Old Boys' Association; for his work for the Old Boys and for organising the school's golden jubilee celebrations in 1935 he was awarded the papal knighthood of St Gregory the Great.

Cricket career
McCarthy played four matches for Taranaki during its brief period as a first-class cricket team. In Taranaki's only first-class victory, against Hawke's Bay in 1896–97, he took 3 for 42 and 4 for 46 with his off-spin. Hawke's Bay reversed the result in their next encounter in 1897–98, although McCarthy took his best figures of 5 for 109 and top-scored in each innings with 27 and 52, his best first-class score. He batted left-handed.

Although Taranaki played no first-class matches after 1898, and McCarthy's cricket for four years was limited to minor matches, he was selected to play for New Zealand in two matches against Lord Hawke's XI in 1902–03. He took three wickets, all of opening batsmen.

In the second match of the first season of the Hawke Cup in 1910–11, McCarthy took 6 for 12 and 4 for 29 as South Taranaki beat North Taranaki. He played his last Hawke Cup game in 1922–23.

References

External links

1874 births
1948 deaths
New Zealand cricketers
Pre-1930 New Zealand representative cricketers
Taranaki cricketers
Knights of St. Gregory the Great
20th-century New Zealand lawyers
People educated at St. Patrick's College, Wellington
People from the West Coast, New Zealand